The Buffalo Hotel, at 111-117 Grant Ave. in Garden City, Kansas, was built in 1886.  It was listed on the National Register of Historic Places in 2008.

It is a masonry building with limestone exterior. It was designed by architects J.H. Stevens and C.L. Thompson in Italianate style.

It was deemed significant "for its association with the early history of Garden City (pop. 28,451) and as a nineteenth century hotel, ...for its association with town founder and western legend Charles Jesse (Buffalo) Jones, and ...as an example of Italianate commercial architecture."

References

External links

Hotel buildings on the National Register of Historic Places in Kansas
Italianate architecture in Kansas
Hotel buildings completed in 1886
Finney County, Kansas
Hotels in Kansas